Gulf Hammock may refer to:

Gulf Hammock (wetlands), a natural area in southern Levy County, Florida
Gulf Hammock, Florida, an unincorporated community at one edge of the wetlands area